"Old-fashioned" is a science fiction short story by American writer Isaac Asimov. The story was written at the request of Kim Armstrong, editor of Bell Telephone Magazine, with the stipulation that it be 3,000 words and center on a problem in communications. The author claimed that he had thought up a plot line before lunch with the editor was over. The story was duly written and published in February 1976. It was illustrated by Gerald McConnell in comic book style.

Plot summary
Two astro-miners in the asteroid belt, Estes and Funarelli, are badly injured when their spaceship is damaged by the tidal effects of an uncharted  black hole. Their drive and communications systems are beyond repair and they have a finite supply of food and air.

In desperation, Estes hits on the idea of going outside the ship and throwing small rocks at the black hole. This will generate bursts of x-rays which, he hopes, will be detected by radio-astronomers on Earth.

He does this several times, attempting to time the bursts so that they spell out S-O-S in Morse code. The attempt works and within days, an unmanned drone ship with supplies arrives from Earth.

External links

References

Short stories by Isaac Asimov
1976 short stories
Works originally published in American magazines
Works originally published in science and technology magazines